Per Sollum Pillai is a 1987 Indian Tamil-language drama film directed by S. P. Muthuraman, starring Kamal Haasan, Raadhika, Manorama, K. R. Vijaya and Raveendran. It is loosely based on the 1960 film Padikkadha Medhai, these both films' dialogues were written by K. S. Gopalakrishnan. The film was later remade in Telugu as Ramu (1987).

Plot 
Kamal Haasan as an orphan, who is adopted by a wealthy family. He gets adopted into the family when he saves the entire family from being deliberately poisoned by a miscreant. K. R. Vijaya, the mother of the family, raises him as one of the family even though others outside the family see him as a servant. Kamal helps to run the family smoothly and looks after his step-parents, brothers and sisters like his own. He remains faithful and grateful to his step-parents for adopting him, an orphan, as their own son. Except for his step-parents and his sister, the other members of his family are jealous of the position his mother gives him in the family. Kamal's step-brothers are pleasure-seeking and lazy and want to live an easy life surviving on their mother's earnings. They also try to exploit a female worker in their house Radhika, whose mother Manorama is the cook of the house.

Kamal intervenes whenever his step-brothers attempt to commit mischief in the family and thwarts all their plans. He tries to advise them to be resourceful, but they hate him for that. They also cannot stand it when their mother sides their step-brother in all her decisions. Kamal also saves his step-sister Ramya Krishnan from being exploited by a rich smuggler's son. Due to his carnal nature, the smuggler's son expresses, to his father, his wish to marry Kamal's step-sister. So the smuggler Malaysia Vasudevan comes to K. R. Vijaya's house seeking her daughter's hand in marriage for his son. The smuggler feels jaded when Kamal convinces his step-mother to refuse her daughter's hand in marriage to his son. The smuggler becomes an enemy to the family and swears to take revenge for being insulted by K. R. Vijaya. So he hatches a plot in conjunction with Kamal's brother-in-law, a corrupt government official Goundamani to destroy Kamal's family.

The smuggler plants illegal explosives in K. R. Vijaya's fireworks factory to humiliate her, to get her arrested by the police, but Kamal comes to her rescue and takes the crime upon himself and goes to jail in her place. He later looks after her when she falls sick when her own sons don't care about her and waste their money in gambling. Instigated by a plot hatched by their brother-in-law, Kamal's step-brothers revolt and take over the factory that their mother controls. They then force Kamal out of the house. Meanwhile, Radhika falls in love with Kamal due to his truthful nature. Kamal's step-brothers make poor business decisions and ruin the prosperous business that their mother had struggled to build. Kamal meanwhile, through his hard-work and resourcefulness builds his own fireworks factory. He comes to the rescue of his mother again when his step-brothers try to forcibly marry their only sister to the enemy's son to cover up their losses. He pays for the losses his brothers had incurred and saves his step-sister and step-parents. He then adopts his step-mother as his own mother and makes her the proprietor of his factory.

In the final scene, the smuggler tries to forcibly get his son married to Vijaya's daughter and also murder her sons and Kamal. Kamal again comes to their rescue and saves the day. But Vijaya is fatally wounded by the smuggler and dies in Kamal's arms.

The movie ends with Kamal's daughter (whom Kamal considers as his own mother that he lost but is now reborn as his daughter, and names her after his mother) celebrating her birthday with the entire family re-united with Kamal as the head of the family.

Cast 

Kamal Haasan as Ramu
K. R. Vijaya as Rajalakshmi
Raadhika  as Seetha
Ramya Krishnan as Rekha
Malaysia Vasudevan as Banuprasad
Babu Antony
Raveendran
Ilavarasan as Rekha's husband
Manorama as Muniyamma
Jai Ganesh as Thiyagarajan
Goundamani as Nagalingam
Sangeetha   as Chandra
Leo Prabu
Baby Sujitha

Soundtrack 
The music was composed by Ilaiyaraaja.

Release and reception 
Per Sollum Pillai was released on 16 July 1987. N. Krishnaswamy of The Indian Express wrote, 'While the sharp edge of the assertive selfishness and sadism of the bad characters of the 1960 film kept violating the good characters (and the audience that identified with them) in an obviously masochistic exercise, one must be thankful that there is no scope for that sort of indulgence in Paer Sollum Pillai".

References

External links 

1980s Tamil-language films
1987 drama films
1987 films
AVM Productions films
Films directed by S. P. Muthuraman
Films scored by Ilaiyaraaja
Films with screenplays by K. S. Gopalakrishnan
Films with screenplays by V. C. Guhanathan
Indian drama films
Tamil films remade in other languages